Events in the year 1826 in Portugal.

Incumbents
Monarch: John VI (until 10 March); Peter IV (until 2 May); Mary II

Events

Arts and entertainment

Sports

Births

8 May – Miguel Ângelo Lupi, painter (died 1883)
27 November – António Augusto Soares de Passos (died 1860)

Deaths
10 March – John VI of Portugal, king (born 1767).

References

 
1820s in Portugal
Portugal
Years of the 19th century in Portugal
Portugal